The 1901 college baseball season, play of college baseball in the United States began in the spring of 1901.  Play largely consisted of regional matchups, some organized by conferences, and ended in June.  No national championship event was held until 1947.

New programs
Washington played its first season of baseball.
Eastern Michigan and North Dakota also launched their varsity programs.

Conference winners
This is a partial list of conference champions from the 1901 season.

References